Dana was the primary Danish research vessel for almost 40 years. It was built in 1937 and served research purposes until 1980. 
On the first cruise into the North Atlantic in 1938 it was discovered that the ship was unsuited for its purpose, as it was not sufficiently stable to allow scientific work. During the Second World War (1940-1945) the ship was kept and maintained in Copenhagen harbour, but with vital engine parts removed and thus never seized by the German occupation force.

The main work from Dana was to conduct marine biological and hydrographical research in the Baltic, North Sea and waters around Faroe Islands and Greenland.
In 1966 Dana was on a cruise to the Sargasso Sea and West Indies (cruise leader Erik Berthelsen), with primary aims to conduct hydrographical research and continue research on the reproductive biology of the European eel.

Dana was succeeded by the research vessel Dana (IV) in 1980. The ship served for a period as guard and crew exchange vessel for oil and gas installations in the North Sea and was eventually sold to P&T Charters. It was completely refurbished, rigged as a 3-masted schooner under the name of Gulden Leeuw and continues to sail as a charter vessel.

References 

1937 ships
Research vessels of Denmark
Ships built in Denmark